The part of Africa that is now Burundi and Rwanda was a feudal monarchy headed by a mwami (king) and a ganwa, a feudal hierarchy of Tutsi nobles and gentry until 1890. In that year the Germans attacked the nation and attempted to subdue it with armed force. Eventually the Germans backed an attempted coup d’état against the king, Mwezi Gisabo. The coup was unsuccessful, but Gisabo was eventually forced to concede and agreed to German suzerainty. The Germans then helped him suppress the revolt. Thus Burundi became part of German East Africa in 1890.

In 1915 during The Great War, Belgian troops from Zaire drove the small number of Germans out of Burundi and took control of the country.

After World War I Germany lost its overseas possessions and the League of Nations mandated Burundi and its southern neighbor, Rwanda, to Belgium as the territory of Ruanda-Urundi in 1923. The western kingdoms of Ruanda-Urundi were stripped from the old colonies and given to British-administered Tanganyika. The Belgians administered the territory through indirect rule, building on the Tutsi-dominated aristocratic hierarchy.

Following World War II, Ruanda-Urundi became a United Nations Trust Territory with Belgium as the administrative authority.

In June 1962 the UN General Assembly terminated the Belgian trusteeship and granted full independence to Rwanda and Burundi. The United States immediately recognized the Burundian government and moved to establish diplomatic relations. The U.S. Embassy in the capital Usumbura (now Bujumbura) was established on July 1, 1962, with Herbert V. Olds as Chargé d'Affaires ad interim. Donald A. Dumont was appointed as Envoy Extraordinary and Minister Plenipotentiary to Burundi on October 25, 1962.

The rank of the mission was changed to Legation effective December 15, 1962, and to Embassy again effective September 16, 1963.

Ambassadors

Notes

See also
Burundi – United States relations
Foreign relations of Burundi
Ambassadors from the United States

References
United States Department of State: Background notes on Rwanda

External links
 United States Department of State: Chiefs of Mission for Burundi
 United States Department of State: Burundi
 United States Embassy in Bujumbura

Burundi
Main
Lists of ambassadors to Burundi